The flagtail wormfish (Clarkichthys bilineatus) is a species of wormfish native to the Pacific coast of the Americas from Mexico to Colombia as well as the Galápagos Islands. This species grows to a length of  SL. This species is the only known member of its genus. The generic name is a compound noun made up of the surname Clark, to honour the American ichthyologist H. Walton Clark (1870-1941) who described the species and ichthys the Greek for "fish".

References

Microdesmidae
flagtail wormfish
Fish of Mexican Pacific coast
Western Central American coastal fauna
Galápagos Islands coastal fauna
Fish described in 1936